The 1969 Little All-America college football team is composed of college football players from small colleges and universities who were selected by the Associated Press (AP) as the best players at each position. For 1969, the AP selected two teams, each team having separate offensive and defensive platoons.

Terry Bradshaw of Louisiana Tech was the first-team quarterback. During his time at Louisiana Tech, hew tallied 6,589 passing yards, the most ever by a quarterback at any Louisiana program. He was drafted by the Pittsburgh Steelers and led the club to four Super Bowl championships.

Halfback Larry Schreiber of Tennessee Tech was named to the first team and was also named Ohio Valley Conference Player of the Year. He rushed for 1,522 yards in 1969 and 4,421 during his collegiate career.

Leon Burns of Long Beach State was named to the first team as a fullback.

First team

Offense
 Quarterback - Terry Bradshaw (senior, 6'3", 215 pounds), Louisiana Tech
 Halfback - Paul Hatchett (senior, 5'9", 185 pounds), North Dakota State
 Halfback - Larry Schreiber (senior, 6'0", 200 pounds), Tennessee Tech
 Fullback - Leon Burns (junior, 6'1", 228 pounds), Long Beach State
 End - Bruce Cerone (senior, 5'11", 193 pounds), Emporia State
 End - Richard McGeorge (senior, 6'4", 233 pounds), Elon
 Tackle - John Kohler (senior, 6'6", 255 pounds), South Dakota
 Tackle - Doug Wilkerson (senior, 6'3", 240 pounds), North Carolina Central
 Guard - Glenn Kidder (senior, 6'2," 230 pounds), McNeese State
 Guard - Joe Stephens (senior, 6'3", 255 pounds), Jackson State
 Center - Dan Buckley (senior, 6'0", 218 pounds), Arkansas State

Defense
 Defensive end - Harvey Adams (senior, 5'10", 205 pounds), Kings Point
 Defensive end - Joe Jones (senior, 6'6", 242 pounds), Tennessee State
 Defensive tackle - Dave Haverdick (senior, 6'2", 245 pounds), Morehead State
 Defensive tackle - Clovis Swinney (senior, 6'3", 238 pounds), Arkansas State
 Middle guard - Teddy Taylor (senior, 6'0", 195 pounds), Eastern Kentucky
 Linebacker - Chip Bennett (senior , 6'3", 230 pounds), Abilene Christian
 Linebacker - Glenn Lafleur (senior, 6'0", 195 pounds), Southwestern Louisiana
 Linebacker - Kevin Lee (senior, 5'11", 220 pounds), Willamette
 Defensive back - Merl Code (senior, 6'1", 200 pounds), North Carolina A&T
 Defensive back - David Hadley (senior, 5'10", 187 pounds), Alcorn A&M
 Defensive back - Bruce Taylor (senior, 5'11", 185 pounds), Boston University

Second team

Offense
 Quarterback - Tom DiMuzio, Delaware
 Halfback - Arthur James, East Texas
 Halfback Frank Lewis, Grambling
 Fullback - Les Kent, Montana
 End - Eddie Bell, Idaho State
 End - Mike Carter, Sacramento State
 Tackle - Bill Crone, Loyola of Los Angeles
 Tackle - Tuufuli Uperesa, Montana
 Guard - Dave Kinkela, Puget Sound
 Guard - Tom Young, Wittenberg
 Center - Mark Maneval, Angelo State

Defense
 Defensive end - Lawrence Esters, Alcorn A&M
 Defensive end - Billy Newsome, Grambling
 Defensive tackle - Charles Blossom, Texas Southern
 Defensive tackle - Carter Campbell, Weber State
 Middle guard - Margarito Guerrero, Texas A&I
 Linebacker - Sidney Allred, Wofford
 Linebacker - Rayford Jenkins, Alcorn A&M
 Linebacker - Doug Linebarger, East Tennessee State
 Defensive back - Steve Krumrei, North Dakota
 Defensive back - Alvin Matthews, Texas A&I
 Defensive back - Steve Sweeters, Santa Clara

See also
 1969 College Football All-America Team

References

Little All-America college football team
Little All-America college football team
Little All-America college football teams